José Gabriel Arrúa Ovelar (born 11 January 1988) is a Paraguayan football manager and former player who played as a midfielder. He is the current manager of Sportivo Trinidense.

Personal life
Arrúa's father Saturnino was also a footballer and a midfielder. He also played for Cerro.

Honours

Manager
Sportivo Trinidense
Paraguayan División Intermedia: 2022

References

External links

1988 births
Living people
Paraguayan footballers
Association football midfielders
Cerro Porteño players
Club Atlético 3 de Febrero players
Sport Colombia footballers
Sportspeople from Asunción
Paraguayan football managers
Sportivo Trinidense managers